The following is a list of the tallest buildings in the world by country, listing only the tallest building in each country. The list is including only completed (or at least topped out) buildings. A total of 25 countries featured in the list have supertall skyscrapers [ and more]. Many countries constructed new tallest buildings in the 2010s, with the oldest tallest building being Caracol in Belize, which has stood as the country's tallest building since 1200 BC. 


Completed
The list includes the tallest (completed or topped out) buildings in each country in the world. Heights are measured to the architectural top, with antennae being excluded.

Under construction 
The list includes the tallest (under construction) buildings that will become their nation's tallest building upon completion.

References

Lists of buildings and structures

Lists of construction records
Lists by country